Slim Callaghan is a fictional London-based private detective created by the writer Peter Cheyney. Like another of Cheyney's characters, the FBI agent Lemmy Caution, he was constructed as a British response to the more hardboiled detectives of American fiction such as Sam Spade and Philip Marlowe. 

After making his debut in the 1938 novel The Urgent Hangman he featured in six further novels and a number of short stories. The novels were all bestsellers. The character has also appeared in a variety of film, television, radio and stage adaptations. The novels enjoyed particular popularity in France where actor Tony Wright played Callaghan in three film adaptations. Other actors to portray  Callaghan include Michael Rennie, Derrick De Marney and Viktor de Kowa who played him in the 1964 German television series Slim Callaghan Intervenes.

Operating out of an office in Mayfair's Berkeley Square he frequently encounters attractive, but deceitful femmes fatales. Callaghan has been described as a "suave, handsome, resourceful, Mayfair-based private detective who is Irish – the nationality was perhaps a tease for Cheyney's patriotic critics".

Novels
The Urgent Hangman (1938)  
Dangerous Curves (1939)
You Can't Keep the Change (1940)
It Couldn't Matter Less (1941)
Sorry You've Been Troubled (1942)
They Never Say When (1944)
Uneasy Terms (1946)

References

Bibliography 
 Goble, Alan. The Complete Index to Literary Sources in Film. Walter de Gruyter, 1999.
 Harrison, Michael. Peter Cheyney, Prince of Hokum: A Biography. N. Spearman, 1954
 James, Russell. Great British Fictional Detectives. Remember When, 21 Apr 2009.
 Knight, Stephen. Crime Fiction Since 1800: Detection, Death, Diversity. Macmillan, 2010.

Fictional private investigators
Literary characters introduced in 1938
Novel series